The Legend of Diyes is the story of the northward migration of the Thracian tribe Dii to the country of Odin. The Dii initially lived among the foothills of the Rhodope Mountains in Thrace.

Further reading
 
 
 Кшукин Д.В. Диево-Городище. Страницы истории / под ред. В.И. Сафронова. Ярославль, 2008. 48 с.
 Тихомиров И.А. Ярославское Поволжье. Краткий путеводитель. Ярославль: Типография В.В. Шпеер, 1909. С. 97–98.

Mythical utopias
Mythology
Mythological kingdoms, empires, and countries
Ancient Greece
Ancient tribes in the Balkans